Ab Garm-e Yek (also Romanized as Āb Garm-e Yek; also known as Āb Garm and Garm Āb) is a village in Maskun Rural District, Jebalbarez District, Jiroft County, Kerman Province, Iran. At the 2006 census, its population was 396, in 67 families.

References 

Populated places in Jiroft County